Tetrahydrophthalic anhydride is an organic compound with the formula C6H8C2O3.  The compound exists as two isomers, this article being focused on the more common cis isomer.  It is a precursor to other compounds including the dicarboxylic acid tetrahydrophthalic acid as well the tetrahydrophthalimide, which is a precursor to the fungicide Captan.  It is a white solid that is soluble in organic solvents.

Tetrahydrophthalic anhydride, the cis isomer, is prepared by the Diels-Alder reaction of butadiene and maleic anhydride.

References

Carboxylic anhydrides
Commodity chemicals